The Valencia Hotel and Arcade (also known as the El Verano Hotel or El Patio Hotel) is a historic hotel in Venice, Florida. It is located at 229 West Venice Avenue. On November 10, 1994, it was added to the U.S. National Register of Historic Places.

References

External links
 Sarasota County listings at National Register of Historic Places
 El Patio Hotel at Florida's Office of Cultural and Historical Programs

National Register of Historic Places in Sarasota County, Florida